Elena Solovey (born 24 February 1947) is a Soviet-Russian film actress. She has appeared in more than 60 films since 1966. She won the award for Best Supporting Actress in the film Faktas at the 1981 Cannes Film Festival.

Selected filmography
 Drama from Ancient Life (Драма из старинной жизни, 1971) as Lyuba
 A Slave of Love (Раба любви, 1975) as  Olga Voznesenskaya 
 An Unfinished Piece for Mechanical Piano (Неоконченная пьеса для механического пианино, 1977) as  Sophia Yegorovna 
 A Few Days from the Life of I.I. Oblomov (Несколько дней из жизни И. И. Обломова, 1980) as  Olga 
 The Suicide Club, or the Adventures of a Titled Person (Клуб самоубийц, или Приключения титулованной особы, 1981) as Lady Wendeler
 Could One Imagine? (Вам и не снилось…, 1981) as Tatyana Koltsova 
 Faktas (Факт, 1981) as  Tekle's sister 
 Look for a Woman (Ищите женщину, 1983) as Clara Rochet 
 Quarantine (Карантин, 1983) as Fyokla 
 The Blonde Around the Corner (Блондинка за углом, 1984) as  Regina 
 Sofia Kovalevskaya (Софья Ковалевская, 1985) as Anne Jaclard 
 Friend (Друг, 1987) as lady with a dog
The Life of Klim Samgin (Жизнь Клима Самгина, 1988) as Vera Petrovna Samgina
 Anna Karamazoff (Анна Карамазофф, 1991) as Silent Film Star 
 Khraniteli (Хранители, 1991) as Galadriel
 The Sopranos (3 episodes, 2002) as Branca Labinski
 We Own the Night (2007) as Kalina Buzhayeva 
 The Immigrant (2013) as Rosie Hertz 
 The Lost City of Z (2016) as Madame Kumel

References

External links

1947 births
Living people
Cannes Film Festival Award for Best Actress winners
People from Neustrelitz
Soviet film actresses
Soviet stage actresses
Soviet emigrants to the United States
Gerasimov Institute of Cinematography alumni